Albert Coppé (26 November 1911 in Bruges – 30 March 1999 in Tervuren) was a Belgian and European politician and economist.

Biography 
Born in Bruges on 26 November 1911, Coppé was a founding member of the CVP party and served in the European Commission as Commissioner for Social Affairs, Transport & Budget under the Malfatti & Mansholt Commissions. He also led an interim High Authority in the European Coal and Steel Community in 1967.

Coppé died in Tervuren on 30 March 1999.

See also
High Authority of the European Coal and Steel Community

External links
 The private papers  and some interviews (INT550, INT613 and INT028) of A. L. Coppé are deposited at the Historical Archives of the EU in Florence 
 Albert Coppé in ODIS - Online Database for Intermediary Structures

|-

|-

|-

|-

|-

|-

1911 births
1999 deaths
Belgian European Commissioners
Politicians from Bruges
Recipients of the Order of Merit of the Federal Republic of Germany
European Commissioners 1967–1970
European Commissioners 1970–1972
European Commissioners 1972–1973
Members of the High Authority of the European Coal and Steel Community